Samuel Clarke  was an Anglican priest in Ireland during the 17th century.

Clarke was educated at Trinity College, Dublin. Clarke was ordained deacon on 19 April 1619 and priest on 11 April 1620. He was Dean of Clonmacnoise from 1633 until 1634.

References

Alumni of Trinity College Dublin
Deans of Clonmacnoise
17th-century Irish people